Cuba competed at the 2011 World Championships in Athletics from August 27 to September 4 in Daegu, South Korea.

Team selection

The Federación Cubana de Atletismo announced a squad of 31 athletes for the
competition.  The team is led by two-time Triple Jump defending champion
Yargelis Savigne and Olympic gold medallist and 110m Hurdles World record
holder Dayron Robles.

The following athlete appeared on the preliminary Entry List, but not on the Official Start List of the specific event:

Medalists
The following competitors from Cuba won medals at the Championships:

| width="78%" align="left" valign="top" |

Results

Men

Decathlon

Women

References

External links
Official local organising committee website
Official IAAF competition website

Nations at the 2011 World Championships in Athletics
World Championships in Athletics
Cuba at the World Championships in Athletics